Timgad District is a district of Batna Province, Algeria.

Municipalities
The district further divides into two municipalities.
Timgad
Ouled Fadel

Districts of Batna Province